Eddie Williamson (born December 11, 1951) is a retired American football coach and former player.  He was the 24th head football coach at the Virginia Military Institute (VMI) in Lexington, Virginia, serving for four seasons, from 1985 to 1988, and compiling a record of 10–33–1.

Head coaching record

References

1951 births
Living people
Baylor Bears football coaches
Davidson Wildcats football players
Duke Blue Devils football coaches
Georgia Bulldogs football coaches
North Carolina Tar Heels football coaches
TCU Horned Frogs football coaches
VMI Keydets football coaches
Wake Forest Demon Deacons football coaches
Furman University alumni